Basarab III cel Bătrân ("the Old"), also known as Laiotă Basarab or Basarab Laiotă (? – 22 December 1480) was Voivode of the principality of Wallachia in the 1470s, repeating the achievement of Dan II in being elected by the boyars as voivode on five occasions. Moreover, he succeeded the same ruler (Radu cel Frumos in Basarab's case) on four occasions. Two of his reigns also surrounded the last period in which Vlad III the Impaler ruled over Wallachia.

In 1479 he joined in the Battle of Breadfield, and died in December 1480.

|-

|-

|-

|-

Rulers of Wallachia
Year of birth unknown
Year of death unknown
15th-century Romanian people
House of Dănești